This is a list of mayors of Martigny. It includes the mayor (Président du Conseil municipal) of the city of Martigny, Valais, Switzerland. Initially, La Bâtiaz (since 1957) and Martigny-Bourg (since 1965) were not part of the municipality.

Martigny
Mayors of Martigny, List
Martigny
Lists of mayors (complete 1900-2013)